Miguel Álvarez may refer to:

 Miguel Álvarez Castro (1795–1855), Salvadoran politician and poet
 Miguel Alvarez del Toro (1917–1996), Mexican biologist
 Miguel Ángel Álvarez (1941–2011), Puerto Rican journalist, comedian and actor
 Miguel Álvarez Santamaría (born 1945), Mexican politician
 Miguel Álvarez Pozo (1949–2016), basketball player from Cuba
 Miguel Álvarez (football manager) (born 1958), Spanish football manager
 Miguel Álvarez (rower) (born 1971), Spanish Olympic rower
 Miguel Álvarez-Fernández (born 1979), Spanish composer
 Miguel Alvarez (Oz), a fictional character on the television show Oz

See also 
Carlos Miguel Álvarez (born 1943), Mexican cyclist